The BP National Championships is a defunct Grand Prix and ATP Tour tennis tournament played from 1988 to 1995. It was held in Wellington in New Zealand and was played on outdoor hard courts.

The tournament began as part of the Regular Series of the Grand Prix before joining the World Series of the ATP Tour when it was formed in 1990. After the tournament was replaced by the Qatar Open in 1993 it became a part of the ATP Challenger Series before being wound up in 1995.

Results

Key

Singles

Doubles

See also
 ATP Auckland Open

External links
 ATP Results Archive

 
ATP Tour
Grand Prix tennis circuit
Hard court tennis tournaments
Tennis tournaments in New Zealand
Defunct tennis tournaments in Oceania
Defunct sports competitions in New Zealand